Lake Pumacocha or Lake Pomacocha (both possibly from Quechua puma cougar, puma, qucha lake) is a lake in Peru located in Jauja Province, Junín. It is located near the boundary between the provinces of Jauja and Concepción.

See also
List of lakes in Peru

References

Lakes of Peru
Lakes of Junín Region